Universidad San Sebastián (USS, St. Sebastian University) is a private autonomous Chilean university with its headquarters situated in Santiago de Chile. It is also located in Concepción (its previous headquarters), Valdivia, Osorno and Puerto Montt.

It was founded in 1989, and later in 2001, USS gets a formal state recognition as University. By 2011, it counted with 21.572 students.

In 2013 the school of medicine of this university was the second biggest in Chile by number of students.

Values
The USS stands by seven values instilled in its students, these are:
 Búsqueda de la verdad "The search of truth"
 Vocación por el trabajo bien hecho "Vocation for well-done work"
 Honestidad "Honesty"
 Responsabilidad "Responsibility"
 Solidaridad "Solidarity"
 Alegría "Happiness"
 Superación "Improvement"

Careers
By 2009, Santiago counted with 32 careers, Concepción 39, Valdivia 16, Osorno 14 and Puerto Montt 17. Some of these are:  
 Architecture
 Physical Education
 Differential Education
 Preschool Education
 History and Geography
 English
 Language and Communication
 Education in Mathematics
 Speech Therapy
 Kinesiology
 Nutrition and Dietetics
 Medical Technology
 Occupational Therapy
 Political Science and Public Management
 Social Work
 Law
 Nursing
 Medicine
 Veterinarian Medicine
 Bachelor of Health Sciences
 Biochemistry
 Chemistry and Pharmacy
 Obstetrics
 Dentistry
 Psychology

Sede Osorno
In June 2013, it was announced that the Osorno campus would not be accepting new students in 2014, generating diverse reaction in the student body.

References

External links 

 Official Website 

Universities in Chile
Universities in Biobío Region
Universities in Los Ríos Region
1989 establishments in Chile
Universities in Los Lagos Region
Universities in Santiago Metropolitan Region